Spinaceto is the urban area 12g of Municipio IX of the city of Rome. It is part of the area Z. XXVIII Tor de 'Cenci.

The population is 25,000.

Education
The Pier Paolo Pasolini public library is in Spinaceto.

References 

Subdivisions of Rome